The Junction is a  entertainment, retail, office, and residential complex in downtown Ogden City, built on the site of the former Ogden City Mall. Its development has been coordinated and subsidized by Ogden City, in an effort to revitalize the city center for economic and cultural growth. The city has worked in partnership with the Boyer Company, The Church of Jesus Christ of Latter-day Saints, Wells Fargo, and other private companies. The Ogden City Mall featured in the video for the pop music hit "I Think We're Alone Now" by Tiffany Darwish.

The Junction's main anchors are the Megaplex 13 theater and the adjacent Salomon Center, which houses Fat Cats bowling and arcade, Gold's Gym, FlowRider pool, iRock climbing wall, iFly indoor skydiving, and some small restaurants. These facilities opened in June 2007. The remainder of The Junction consists of two office buildings, several restaurants, a large parking garage, and a number of condominium and apartment buildings with retail space on the ground level. 

As an economic investment for Ogden City, The Junction has been controversial. Skeptics point out that The Junction's tax revenues have fallen far short of what was originally promised, and that taxpayers will be subsidizing payments on The Junction's bonded debt for many years to come. On the other hand, proponents argue that The Junction has enhanced downtown Ogden and indirectly helped other downtown businesses to prosper.

History
The site was originally occupied by Ogden City Mall from 1980 to 2002. Its tenants included The Bon Marché (later Lamonts), J. C. Penney, Meier & Frank (previously Weinstock's and ZCMI), and Nordstrom.

Tenants
Tenants of the complex include:

Dining
Iggy's Sports Grill
Sonora Grill
Five Guys Burgers & Fries
Subway
Brixton’s Baked Potatoes
Sub Zero Ice Cream

Shopping
Black & Decker Outlet
Deseret Book
Pro Tools
G4G Adventure Sports
Recreation Outlet
Tookiloo
Ogden ROX

Services
T-Mobile
Wells Fargo
FedEx Services
DAKCS Software Systems
Coldwell Banker
The Buckner Group
Van Cott Bagley Law

Travel
Hilton Garden Inn

External links
 Ogden Junction
 Megaplex 13
 Salomon Center
 Treehouse Museum
 Junction 101, article on Weber County Forum

Shopping malls in Utah
Shopping malls established in 2007
Buildings and structures in Ogden, Utah
Tourist attractions in Ogden, Utah